Gregory Richard Cunningham (born 31 January 1991) is an Irish professional footballer who plays as a left back for Preston North End. He has previously played for Manchester City, Bristol City and Cardiff City, and had loan spells with Leicester City, Nottingham Forest and Blackburn Rovers. Cunningham is currently in his third term at Preston, including one loan.

Cunningham represented the Republic of Ireland national team from 2010 to 2013, after several appearances at various youth levels.

Club career

Manchester City

Born in Galway, County Galway, Cunningham began his career with Cregmore FC. In 2004, he joined Mervue United before earning a contract in the Manchester City Academy. Cunningham made his first team debut for Manchester City as a 46th minute substitute in a 4–2 victory over Scunthorpe United in the FA Cup on 24 January 2010 where he played on the left side of the City defence.

Cunningham made his first Premier League appearance on 11 April 2010 against Birmingham City as a substitute for Adam Johnson in the final minutes of the game. He made his second Premier League appearance on 9 May 2010 against West Ham United as a substitute for Johnson, just two minutes of the final minutes of the game. On 26 August 2010, Cunningham made his European debut in Europa League Qualifiers Second Leg against Politehnica Timișoara, coming on as a 54th-minute substitute for Nigel de Jong in a 2–0 win. On 22 September 2010, he made his first start for the club and played 90 minutes in a 2–1 loss against West Bromwich Albion in the League Cup.

Leicester City (loan)
On 21 October 2010, Cunningham joined Championship side Leicester City on loan until January 2011. On 23 October 2010, he made his debut for the club in a 2–0 loss against Swansea City where he played the full 90 minutes. He became a regular left-back in the starting eleven and made 12 starts. On 1 January 2011, Cunningham fractured his tibia in a challenge with Hull City's Liam Rosenior. Rosenior was sent off and Cunningham had to be substituted in a 1–0 win for Leicester and he was ruled out of action for up to four months, which ended his loan spell at Leicester City. After the match, Sven-Göran Eriksson stated his injury was 'a complete accident' and said:

Nottingham Forest (loan)
On 25 October 2011, Cunningham joined Championship side Nottingham Forest on loan until 31 December after an injury crisis at the club left them desperately short on defensive options. After his move to Nottingham Forest, he said he expected to make an impact for the club and was looking forward to playing regularly for the club Nottingham Forest duo Lee Camp and Ishmael Miller agreed with Cunningham's expectations. On 29 October 2011, Cunningham made his debut for the club in a 1–0 loss against Hull City before being substituted early in the second-half. On 1 November 2011, he played 90 minutes in a 1–0 win over Reading. Since making his debut, he became a regular in the starting eleven, playing at left back.

On 29 December, Cunningham's loan was extended until the end of the season. After his loan was extended, manager Steve Cotterill said he would want to sign Cunningham on a permanent basis, only if the money could be found in the near future. After his loan spell ended, Cotterill praised Cunningham (among the loan signing) for helping the club pull away from the relegation zone and stay in the Championship next season.

Bristol City
The following season, Cunningham told BBC Sport he intended to leave Manchester City to further his career. On 5 July 2012, he signed a four-year contract at Bristol City, for an undisclosed fee.

Cunningham made his debut on the opening game of the season, in a 1–0 loss against Nottingham Forest. Then, in a 2–1 win over Peterborough United, on 18 September 2012, he received a heavy tackle from Tyrone Barnett after Barnett made a reckless challenge on him, which resulted in Cunningham being stretchered off and Barnett being booked. After the match, Derek McInnes stated his belief that Barnett should have been sent-off for the challenge Cunningham was ruled out for two months after rupturing his tendon. In mid-December, he recovered from the injury and made his return in a 2–0 loss against Derby County on 15 December 2012. On 29 January 2013, he scored his first goal for Bristol City against Watford, a cross that had looped over Manuel Almunia and found its way into the back of the net. Since his recovery from injury, Cunningham continued to retain his first team place, but the club was relegated to League One.

Cunningham was part of the squad that won promotion back to the Championship in 2015.

Preston North End
Bristol City gave Cunningham permission to speak to Preston North End after accepting an undisclosed bid, he spent the weekend with Preston in Scotland at a training camp before the deal was completed on 27 July 2015.

Cunningham became Preston's established left-back under Simon Grayson scoring four goals including a late winner at former club Bristol City in January 2016.

On 24 July 2017, Cunningham was appointed captain of Preston until such a time as Tom Clarke became fit again.

He continued to impress as Preston became an established Championship side and as such Cunningham began to attract the attention of other Championship and Premiership sides.

Cardiff City
With Preston unable to find the consistency to mount a sustained challenge on the playoffs Cunningham joined Cardiff City on 13 June 2018, for an undisclosed fee, believed to be around £4 million signing a three-year contract.

However, since signing Cunningham has found his opportunities at Cardiff limited playing only seven times as the club were relegated from the Premier League.

Blackburn Rovers (loan)
Despite relegation to the Championship Cunningham was still unable to break into the Cardiff starting XI and on 8 August 2019 Cunningham joined Blackburn Rovers on loan until the end of the season. In October, he suffered a cruciate knee ligament injury that ruled him out for the remainder of the season. He remained with Blackburn until January, when his loan deal was terminated due to the injury.

Preston North End
On 28 January 2021, Cunningham rejoined Preston North End on loan for the remainder of the 2020-21 season. Soon after on 6 February 2021, it was announced that he had signed permanently on a deal until the end of the season so Preston can fit all their loan signings in their matchday squad. On 26 April 2021, Cunningham signed a new contract that would see him remain at the club until the summer of 2023, having originally being out of contract at the end of the 2020–21 season.

International career

Cunningham had been capped by the Republic of Ireland at youth level before being called up to the senior international squad by manager Giovanni Trapattoni on 22 February 2010 for a friendly against Brazil. On 28 May 2010, he made his debut for Ireland in a 3–0 win against Algeria at the RDS.

Career statistics

Club

International

Honours
Bristol City

Football League Trophy: 2014–15

References

External links

 
 Republic of Ireland U17 profile at Soccer Scene
 Republic of Ireland U19 profile at Soccer Scene

1991 births
Living people
Sportspeople from Galway (city)
Association footballers from County Galway
Association football defenders
Republic of Ireland association footballers
Republic of Ireland youth international footballers
Republic of Ireland under-21 international footballers
Republic of Ireland international footballers
Manchester City F.C. players
Cardiff City F.C. players
Leicester City F.C. players
Nottingham Forest F.C. players
Preston North End F.C. players
Bristol City F.C. players
Blackburn Rovers F.C. players
Premier League players
English Football League players
Mervue United A.F.C. players